Richard Varkulis (born 21 May 1982) is a former rugby league footballer whose previous clubs include; the Leigh Centurions, the Warrington Wolves, the Rochdale Hornets, Halifax (two spells, including the first on loan), the Widnes Vikings and Whitehaven.

Varkulis began his career with Leigh Centurions Academy and spent part of the 2002 season with Woolongong Bulls in Australia after representing British Amateur Rugby League Association Young Lions in 2001. He began his professional career by signing for the Warrington Wolves in 2003 and finished top try scorer with thirty tries in twenty-four appearances for the Senior Academy. Varkulis scored three tries in five appearances during 2004's Super League IX for the Warrington Wolves. He spent loan spells with the Rochdale Hornets and Halifax.

Widnes Vikings signed Varkulis for the 2009 season as a strong running Centre from Halifax scoring 10 tries in 22 appearances.  He picked up a Northern Rail Cup Winners medal in 2009 scoring a try in the 34-18 victory over Barrow Raiders and ended the season signing a two-year contract extension with Widnes Vikings until the end of 2011 season.

In 2010, Varkulis scored 10 tries in 22 appearances including a hat trick against Barrow Raiders.

In 2011, although still wearing the number 3 shirt, new Widnes Coach Denis Betts switched Varkulis to Prop where he has used his size and strength to become an excellent asset to the Vikings pack. He made 27 appearances and scored seven tries including a Challenge Cup try against Hull F.C.

Despite being voted 3rd in the Player of the Year Awards, Varkulis was released by Widnes Vikings at the end of the 2011 season along with 12 other players as the Vikings prepared for life in Super League.  He became a Whitehaven player in November 2011 for 2012 season making 26 appearances and scoring 8 tries.

In 2013, Varkulis switched codes and joined Chester RUFC and operated as an Inside Centre.

Career Statistics

References 

1982 births
Halifax R.L.F.C. players
Leigh Leopards players
Living people
Place of birth missing (living people)
Rochdale Hornets players
Rugby league centres
English rugby league players
Rugby league props
Warrington Wolves players
Whitehaven R.L.F.C. players
Widnes Vikings players